The 1979 Rivers State gubernatorial election occurred on July 28, 1979. NPN candidate Melford Okilo won the election.

Results
Melford Okilo representing NPN won the election. The election held on July 28, 1979.

References 

Rivers State gubernatorial elections
Rivers State gubernatorial election
Rivers State gubernatorial election